"Fat Bottomed Girls" is a song by the British rock band Queen. Written by guitarist Brian May, the song appears on the band's seventh studio album Jazz (1978) and later on their compilation album Greatest Hits. When released as a single with "Bicycle Race", the song reached number 11 in the UK Singles Chart and number 24 in the Billboard Hot 100 in the US.

The song is formed around an open bluesy, metallic guitar tuning, and opens with its chorus. It was one of the few Queen songs played in an alternative (drop D) guitar tuning. The song's music video was filmed at the Dallas Convention Center in Texas in October 1978.

Song and lyrical content
The two songs were released together on a double A-sided single, and both songs refer to each other. Near the end of "Fat Bottomed Girls", the song references "Bicycle Race", with Mercury shouting, "Get on your bikes and ride!" "Bicycle Race" reciprocates with the line "fat bottomed girls, they'll be riding today".

Reception
Cash Box said it has "a solid thumping beat, soaring harmonies and sonorous guitar work." Record World said that it combines "inventive lyrics and harmonies" with class.

Live performances 
Queen performed "Fat Bottomed Girls" in concert from 1978 to 1982. Since its release, the song has appeared on television and film, and has been covered by a number of artists.

The song was performed on the setlists of their Queen + Adam Lambert tours in 2012, 2014–2015, 2016 and 2017–2018 featuring Adam Lambert and at the iHeartRadio Music Festival 2013 as Queen + Adam Lambert featuring Fun.

Other versions
The song featured a different vocal arrangement from the studio recording when performed live. In live performances, the lead vocals during the chorus were sung by Freddie Mercury and harmonized with an upper voice (Roger Taylor) and a lower voice (Brian May). In the studio version, there is no higher harmony. The lead vocals on the verses are sung by Freddie Mercury, while Brian May sings the lead vocals on the chorus.

The single version (which can be found on Greatest Hits, but not the 1992 US "Red Cover" version) omits the extended guitar interludes between the verses and fades out before the ending.

Legacy 
During an interview with The A.V. Club, Michael McKean stated that "Fat Bottomed Girls" was an influence for the song "Big Bottom" in the 1984 mockumentary film This Is Spinal Tap.

Sales and certifications

Personnel
Freddie Mercury – lead and backing vocals
Brian May – electric guitar, lead chorus, backing vocals
Roger Taylor – drums, backing vocals
John Deacon – bass guitar

Live recordings
Queen on Fire - Live at the Bowl
Return of the Champions
Super Live in Japan
Live in Ukraine
Bohemian Rhapsody: The Original Soundtrack

Chart performance

Weekly charts

Year-end charts

References

External links
 Official YouTube videos: original music video, Live at the Bowl, Queen + Paul Rodgers
 Lyrics at Queen official website (from Queen Rocks)

1978 songs
1978 singles
Queen (band) songs
Songs written by Brian May
Song recordings produced by Roy Thomas Baker
EMI Records singles
Elektra Records singles
Hollywood Records singles
Glam rock songs